Badnaam Gali is 2019 Indian Hindi film released on ZEE5 on 10 May 2019. The film is about a surrogate mother. The film stars Patralekha Paul and  Divyendu Sharma. The web film released on the occasion of Mother's Day. The film deals with  surrogacy in a humorous way.

Cast
 Patralekha Paul as Nayonika (Nayan) 
 Divyendu Sharma as Randeep Singh Sodhi 
 Dolly Ahluwalia as Randeep's Bhua Ji.
 Paritosh Sand as Randeep's father

Reception
The film received positive reviews. Ishita Sengupta of Indian Express stated that it is a fun film on surrogacy. Nafees Ahmed of High On Films wrote in his review,"Badnaam Gali is chocking with cliches for a subject matter that is original and exciting. Unfortunately, the writers played it safe to drive the point home."

References

External links
 
Badnaam Gali on ZEE5

2019 films
Films set in Delhi
Indian pregnancy films
Films about surrogacy
Teenage pregnancy in film
Films about sperm donation
ZEE5 original films
2019 direct-to-video films